The Midville, Swainsboro and Red Bluff Railroad was chartered in 1888.  It began operations on a line between Midville and Swainsboro, Georgia, USA, sometime before 1890.  It apparently never reached Red Bluff and was noted on some documents as the Midville and Swainsboro Railroad. The railroad became the Atlantic and Gulf Short Line Railroad in 1900, eventually being sold to the Georgia and Florida Railway in 1907.

Defunct Georgia (U.S. state) railroads
Railway companies established in 1888
Railway companies disestablished in 1900
Predecessors of the Southern Railway (U.S.)
American companies disestablished in 1900